El Santa (from  late Coptic) is a city in the Gharbia Governorate, Egypt. Its population was estimated at about 42,000 people in 2018.

References 

Populated places in Gharbia Governorate